Alexander Galaisha (born April 6, 1991) is a Kazakhstani former professional ice hockey goaltender.

Galaisha played one game in the Kontinental Hockey League (KHL) with  HC Yugra during the 2012–13 KHL season.

References

External links

1991 births
Living people
Dizel Penza players
Kazakhstani ice hockey goaltenders
Molot-Prikamye Perm players
Sportspeople from Astana
HC Yugra players